Luciano Castán da Silva (born September 13, 1989) is a Brazilian footballer who plays for Guarani as a central defender.

Club career
Castán started his professional career with União São João in 2007, before moving to Santos in January 2010. However, he appeared only once during his time in Peixe, starting and being sent off in a 4–2 home win against Sertãozinho, for the Paulista championship.

Castán moved to Ponte Preta on loan in December 2010. After again serving as a backup (only 180 minutes of action), he joined Paraná in February. On 27 January 2012 he moved to Bragantino, rescinding his link on 21 June.

On 19 November 2012 Castán moved to São Bernardo. After impressing during the club's 2013 Copa Paulista winning campaign and during 2014 Campeonato Paulista, he joined Portuguesa on 2 May 2014.

In July 2016, Castán signed with French side Stade Brestois 29. On 3 December 2018, he returned to Brazil and joined newly promoted club CSA.

Personal life
His brother, Leandro, is also a professional football player and also plays as a centre back.

References

External links

1989 births
Living people
Footballers from São Paulo
Brazilian footballers
Association football defenders
Campeonato Brasileiro Série A players
Campeonato Brasileiro Série B players
União São João Esporte Clube players
Santos FC players
Associação Atlética Ponte Preta players
Paraná Clube players
Clube Atlético Bragantino players
São Bernardo Futebol Clube players
Stade Brestois 29 players
Associação Portuguesa de Desportos players
Centro Sportivo Alagoano players
Coritiba Foot Ball Club players
Ligue 2 players
Al-Khor SC players
Expatriate footballers in Qatar
Brazilian expatriate sportspeople in Qatar